Dejan Dabović (3 August 1944 – 6 December 2020) was a Yugoslav water polo player notable for winning a gold medal in Mexico City in 1968, with the Yugoslavian water polo team. 

Dabović was born in Herceg Novi and died from COVID-19 in Belgrade, at age 76.

See also
 Yugoslavia men's Olympic water polo team records and statistics
 List of Olympic champions in men's water polo
 List of Olympic medalists in water polo (men)

References

External links
 

1944 births
2020 deaths
People from Herceg Novi
Sportspeople from Rijeka
Montenegrin male water polo players
Serbian male water polo players
Yugoslav male water polo players
Olympic water polo players of Yugoslavia
Olympic gold medalists for Yugoslavia
Water polo players at the 1968 Summer Olympics
Water polo players at the 1976 Summer Olympics
Olympic medalists in water polo
Medalists at the 1968 Summer Olympics
Deaths from the COVID-19 pandemic in Serbia